The Prospect 900 is a sailboat that was designed by Dutch naval architect Ericus Gerhardus van de Stadt and first built in 1975.

Production

The boat was built by Rydgeway Marine in the United Kingdom, starting in 1975, but is now out of production.

Design
The Prospect 900 is a small recreational keelboat, built predominantly of fiberglass. It has a masthead sloop rig, an internally-mounted spade-type rudder and a lifting keel. It displaces  and carries  of iron ballast.

It has a  fresh water tank and  fuel tank.

See also
List of sailing boat types

Similar sailboats
Alberg 29
Bayfield 29 
C&C 29
Hunter 290
Mirage 29
Northwind 29
Tanzer 29
Thames Marine Mirage 29
Watkins 29

References

External links

Keelboats
1970s sailboat type designs
Sailing yachts
Sailboat type designs by E. G. van de Stadt
Sailboat types built by Rydgeway Marine